Acossus undosus is a species of moth of the family Cossidae. It is found in the United States, including Wyoming, Utah and possibly surrounding states.

The wingspan is about 58 mm.

References

Moths described in 1878
Taxa named by Joseph Albert Lintner
Cossinae
Moths of North America